Philipp Johann Heinrich Fauth (19 March 1867 — 4 January 1941) was a German selenographer.

Biography
Born in Bad Dürkheim, he worked as a schoolteacher.  His interest in astronomy was sparked when his father showed him Coggia's comet. As an amateur astronomer, he studied the formations on the Moon with great intensity and meticulousness. He compiled an extensive atlas of the moon between 1884 and 1940 (which was not completely published until 1964, and prized today as a rare book). His Unser Mond was published in Bremen in 1936.

Working from an observatory in Landstuhl, Fauth represented the moon in twenty-four sectors. Unfortunately, Fauth carried out this immense work at the same time that advances were being made in photography that allowed for a more reliable depiction of the lunar surface.

In 1913 with co-author Hanns Hörbiger he published his now-defunct World Ice Theory (Glazial-Kosmogonie), which was subsequently investigated by Hans Schindler Bellamy.

In 1939, Heinrich Himmler gave him the title of professor, although Fauth had never taught at a university and never received a doctorate. Fauth was a member of the Nazi Party and worked as a scientist and SS officer for the SS-Ahnenerbe.

He died in Grünwald, Bavaria.

The crater Fauth on the Moon is named after him.

Notes

External links
 Fauth biography in Chuck Wood's Moon

1867 births
1941 deaths
Amateur astronomers
19th-century German astronomers
People from Bad Dürkheim
People from the Palatinate (region)
Selenographers
20th-century German astronomers